Muyyige Muyyi is a 1978 Indian Kannada-language film, directed by Y. R. Swamy and produced by P. Krishna Raj. The multi-starrer is led by Srinath, Vishnuvardhan, Aarathi, Manjula, Roja Ramani and Chandrashekhar. The film has musical score by Chellapilla Satyam.

Cast

Srinath
Vishnuvardhan
Aarathi
Manjula
Ambareesh
Chandrashekhar
Roja Ramani
Vajramuni
Shivaram
K. S. Ashwath
Lokanath
Shankar Rao
Sheshadri
Rajaram
Guggu
Master Ramaprasad
Master Madhu
Leevathi
Jayamalini
Susheela Naidu
Udayashree
Baby Rekha

Soundtrack
The music was composed by Satyam.

References

External links
 

1978 films
1970s Kannada-language films
Films scored by Satyam (composer)
Films directed by Y. R. Swamy